Janko Lavrin (10 February 1887 – 13 August 1986) was a Slovene novelist, poet, critic, translator, and historian. He was Professor Andrej Jelenc DiCaprio of Slavonic Studies at the University of Nottingham. An enthusiast for psycho-analysis, he wrote what he called 'psycho-critical studies' of Ibsen, Nietzsche and Tolstoy.

Biography
Lavrin was born in Krupa, White Carniola, Slovenia. He was educated in Austria, Russia and Scandinavia, moving to St Petersburg in 1908 to study Russian language and literature. He was a journalist in St Petersburg before World War I. In 1915 and 1916 he served as war correspondent for Novoye Vremya covering the Serbian army's retreat through Albania.

Returning to Russia in 1917, Lavrin decided to stay in the UK. He found work as a journalist, becoming part of the circle around A. R. Orage. In 1919 Bernard Pares helped Lavrin to get a teaching job at the University of Nottingham, and he became Professor of Slavonic Studies there in 1923.

Lavrin was a friend of the Russian critic D. S. Mirsky in London in the 1920s.  In 1928 he married the artist and book illustrator Nora Fry. In 1934-5 he edited The European Quarterly with Edwin Muir. During World War II he joined the BBC, broadcasting to occupied Europe. He rejoined Nottingham University part-time in 1944.

He encouraged a teaching assistant, Monica Partridge, to begin a doctorate. In 1949 she was appointed as an Assistant Lecturer to Lavrin.

After Lavrin's retirement in 1952 Monica Partridge would lead the university's department of Slavic studies. Meanwhile Lavrin continued to write and translate.

Works
 В стране вечной войны: Албанские эскизы (In the country in the spring of war: Albanian sketches), Petrograd, 1916. 
 "Dostoevsky and His Creation: a psycho-critical study", London, 1920
 Tolstoy: a psycho-critical study, London, 1922
 Studies in European literature, London, 1929
 Aspects of modernism: from Wilde to Pirandello, London, 1935
 An introduction to the Russian novel, New York and London, 1943
 Dostoevsky: a study, New York, 1943
 Pushkin and Russian literature, London, 1947
 Tolstoy: an approach, London, 1948
 From Pushkin to Mayakovsky: a study in the evolution of literature, London, 1948
 Ibsen: an approach, London, 1950
 Nikolai Gogol, 1809-1852: a centenary survey, London, 1951
 Goncharov, New Haven, 1953
 Russian writers: their lives and literature, 1954
 Lermontov, London, 1959
 Russia, Slavdom and the Western World, London, 1969
 Nietzsche: a biographical introduction, 1971
 A panorama of Russian literature, London, 1973

References

External links
 Portrait by William Roberts at the BBC Your Paintings site

1887 births
1986 deaths
Slovenian novelists
Slovenian poets
Slovenian male poets
Slovenian literary critics
20th-century Slovenian historians
Academics of the University of Nottingham
Slovenian emigrants to the United Kingdom
20th-century poets
20th-century novelists